Mark Walrod Harrington (August 18, 1848 – September 10, 1926) was an American scientist, the first civilian head of the United States Weather Bureau, and former president of the University of Washington. Considered a prominent scientist in the late 19th century, Harrington studied and published works in multiple disciplines, including botany, astronomy, meteorology, and geology, and knew a half-dozen languages. His academic achievements were overshadowed by his disappearance in 1899, when he left home one day and disappeared for many years. His wife and son located him in 1908 at a psychiatric hospital in New Jersey where he had been admitted as patient John Doe No. 8.

Biography 
Born in Sycamore, Illinois, Harrington was the son of James Harrington and Charlotte Walrod Harrington. In 1878, he married Rose Martha Smith, with whom he had a son (Mark Raymond). Mark Raymond Harrington was a well-known archaeologist.

From 1879 to 1891, he was professor of astronomy and director of the Detroit Observatory of the University of Michigan in Ann Arbor. During this time, he published an astronomical observation recorded by Johan Ludvig Emil Dreyer as NGC 7040 in the New General Catalogue. He founded The American Meteorological Journal in 1884, of which he published the first seven volumes.

In 1891, Harrington was appointed by President Benjamin Harrison as the first civilian chief of the United States Weather Bureau. He served in this role until 1895, when he was ousted by Secretary of Agriculture Julius Morton, who convinced newly inaugurated President Grover Cleveland to let him fire Harrington. 

In 1895, he was elected president of the University of Washington to succeed Thomas Milton Gatch. He remained in this office until 1897.

He left his home one evening in 1899 and disappeared for about 7 years.  According to news accounts, Harrington had lost his memory but after several years in psychiatric institutions, developed a fondness for music. He died on September 10, 1926 in Morris Plains, New Jersey.

References 

1848 births
1926 deaths
People from Sycamore, Illinois
National Weather Service people
Presidents of the University of Washington
19th-century American botanists
19th-century American astronomers
19th-century American geologists
University of Michigan faculty
Academic journal editors
American science writers
American male writers
19th-century American non-fiction writers
Formerly missing people
Deaths in mental institutions
People with amnesia